NCSC may refer to:

Organizations

 National Commission for Scheduled Castes, India
 National Cyber Security Centre (Ireland)
 National Cyber Security Centre (United Kingdom)

United States
 National Catholic Student Coalition
 National Center for State Courts
 National Computer Security Center, part of the National Security Agency
 National Council for Senior Citizens
 National Counterintelligence and Security Center
 National Cybersecurity Center
 North Carolina Solar Center

See also